Bhurgari railway station is located in Village Ghulam Nabi Bhurgri, Taluka Shahdadkot, District Qamber Shahdadkot District, Sind, Pakistan.

History
The North-Western Railway ran through the district from north to south. Alight railway was constructed from Larkana to Kamber and thence to Shahdadkot and Jacobabad in Upper Sindh in 1918 during First World War. The names of the Railway Stations are as follows; 1) Larkana 2)Biro Chandio3) Pir Muhammad Metlo 4)Kamber 5)Bahram (Hethyon) 6)Ghulam Muhammad Kariro near Golo Wah 7)Silra Shahdadkot 8)Bhurgri Station 9)Umed Ali Junejo. After this came the Railway Station of Garhi Khero in District Jacobabad.

Station was formed after great struggle by villagers, before the creation Pakistan. People went to the capital of the country for formation of the railway station.

After 2010 Floods
Most of the Railway Stations have been deserted and are occupied by the flood affected poor people who have made them as their shelter due to severe poverty.

See also
Bhurgri
 List of railway stations in Pakistan
 Pakistan Railways
Abdul Ghafoor Bhurgri

References

External links

Railway stations in Qambar Shahdadkot District
Railway stations on Larkana–Jacobabad line